The Walkerjet Spider is a Czech paramotor that was designed by Victor Procházka and produced by Walkerjet of Třemošná for powered paragliding. Now out of production, when it was available the aircraft was supplied complete and ready-to-fly.

Design and development
The Spider was designed to comply with the US FAR 103 Ultralight Vehicles rules as well as European regulations. It features a paraglider-style wing, single-place accommodation and a single  Radne Raket 120 engine in pusher configuration with a 3:1 ratio reduction drive and a  diameter two-bladed wooden propeller. The aircraft is built from a combination of bolted aluminium and 4130 steel tubing. The propeller cage can be dismantled for ground transport or storage.

As is the case with all paramotors, take-off and landing is accomplished by foot. Inflight steering is accomplished via handles that actuate the canopy brakes, creating roll and yaw.

Specifications (Spider)

References

Spider
2000s Czech ultralight aircraft
Single-engined pusher aircraft
Paramotors